Thobo Kgoboge is a Botswanan footballer who currently plays for Nico United. He has won one cap for the Botswana national football team.

External links

1982 births
Living people
Association football forwards
Botswana footballers
Botswana international footballers
Nico United players